Kepler-440b (also known by its Kepler Object of Interest designation KOI-4087.01) is a confirmed super-Earth exoplanet orbiting within the habitable zone of Kepler-440, about  from Earth. The planet was discovered by NASA's Kepler spacecraft using the transit method, in which the dimming effect that a planet causes as it crosses in front of its star is measured. NASA announced the confirmation of the exoplanet on 6 January 2015.

Confirmed exoplanet 
Kepler-440b is a 
[super-Earth] with a radius 1.86 times that of Earth. The planet orbits Kepler-440 once every 101.1 days.

Habitability 
The planet was announced as being located within the habitable zone of Kepler-440, a region where liquid water could exist on the surface of the planet.

See also 
 Habitability of K-type main-sequence star systems
 List of potentially habitable exoplanets

References

External links 
 NASA – Mission overview.
 NASA – Kepler Discoveries – Summary Table.
 NASA – Kepler-440b at The NASA Exoplanet Archive.

 NASA – Kepler-440b at The Extrasolar Planets Encyclopaedia.
 Habitable Exolanets Catalog at UPR-Arecibo.

440b
Exoplanets discovered in 2015
Super-Earths in the habitable zone
Transiting exoplanets
Lyra (constellation)